The Iranian crewed spacecraft is a proposal by the Iranian Space Agency and Iranian Aerospace Research Institute of the Iranian Space Research Center (ISRC) to put an astronaut into space.

Iran expressed for the first time its intention to send a human to space during the summit of Soviet and Iranian Presidents in 1990. Soviet President Mikhail Gorbachev reached an agreement in principle with erstwhile President Akbar Hashemi Rafsanjani to make joint Soviet-Iranian crewed flights to Mir space station but agreement was never realized after dissolution of USSR.

Iranian News Agency claimed on 21 November 2005, that the Iranians have a human space program along with plans for the development of a spacecraft and a space laboratory.  Iran Aerospace Industries Organization (IAIO) head Reza Taghipour on 20 August 2008, revealed Iran intends to launch a human mission into space within a decade. This goal was described as the country's top priority for the next 10 years, in order to make Iran the leading space power of the region by 2021.

In August 2010, President Ahmadinejad announced that Iran's first astronaut should be sent into space on board an Iranian spacecraft by no later than 2019 and expressed the wish to be this first astronaut after retirement from president status.

Some details of the design were published by the institute in its "Astronaut" publication in February 2015.  A mock up of the spaceship was displayed on 17 February 2015 during the ceremony of the national day of space of Iran. The head of the institute announced that the spaceship will be launched to space in about one year, which did not happen. The Iranian President and several of the ministers were present in the unveiling and the ceremony.

If funded and developed ,it would be  comparable to the US Mercury and SU Vostok classes of spacecraft.The Iranian small capsuled spacecraft would carry a single astronaut to a 175 km altitude and return it to Earth. The spacecraft was designated the code name "Class E Kavoshgar" project. The main components include the launcher adapter, spacecraft, and the launch abort system. A sub-orbital test flight with monkey was conducted in 2016.

According to Iran's Space Administrator, this program was put on hold in 2017 indefinitely.

According to unofficial Chinese internet sources, an Iranian participation in the future Chinese space station program has been under discussion. Currently Iran doesn't have a medium lift rocket similar to Long March 2F, GSLV Mk III and H-IIA. Therefore, developing of full scale spacecraft able to dock with any station is unlikely by Iran due to the lack of equipment.

See also
Pishgam

References

External links 
 Aerospace Research Institute
 Iranian Space Research Center  
 Iran Space Agency 

Space program of Iran
Human spaceflight programs